Treworlas is a hamlet west of Veryan, Cornwall, England, United Kingdom, part of the civil parish of Philleigh.

Henry Jenner suggested that Treworlas was named after Gorlois, the legendary duke of Cornwall, who he believed was a real fifth or sixth century figure, either a petty chief as a vassal of the Royal House of Dumnonia, or of the line of the original chiefs of the Dumnonii if the kings of Dumnonia were the leaders of the Britons displaced by the Saxons.

References

Hamlets in Cornwall